École nationale supérieure des sciences appliquées et de technologie de Lannion (ENSSAT) a French engineering College created in 1986.

The school trains engineers in four specialties: Computer Science, Photonics, Digital Systems, and Multimedia Computer Science & Networks.

Located in Lannion, the ENSSAT is a public higher education institution. The school is a member of the University of Rennes 1.

Notable alumni 
 Yves Gentet, a French engineer and artist

References

External links
 ENSSAT

Engineering universities and colleges in France
Côtes-d'Armor
ENSSAT
Educational institutions established in 1986
1986 establishments in France